The PolyU Faculty of Construction and Environment is one of the faculty at the Hong Kong Polytechnic University. The faculty consists of the Department of Building and Real Estate, Department of Building Services Engineering , Department of Civil and Environmental Engineering , and Department of Land Surveying and Geo-Informatics. In 2021, the faculty has around 115 full-time academic staff.

Overview 
The history of the Faculty can be date back to 1937. Today's Department of Building and Real Estate within the Faculty is established in 1937 as the Building Department of Government Trade School, Hong Kong. The Faculty has a long history of offering undergraduate and postgraduate programmes in the fields of building engineering, civil engineering, fire engineering, occupational safety and health, structural engineering and surveying.

The Faculty also offers professional training on Surveying and Geo-Information Technology to different government agencies, including Macau Cartography and Cadastre Bureau.

Research 
The Faculty involves in research of combining smart city technology to optimise trip planning. Moreover, the Faculty's Ng Wing Hong Laboratory for Sustainable City contributes in research of high-level information technology infrastructure for examining the sustainable development of Hong Kong at the building and city level.

References

External links

Hong Kong Polytechnic University